Robert Gaca (born 24 April 1980) is a Polish footballer (defender) playing currently for Polonia Słubice.

Clubs 
 1998-2001  GKP Gorzów Wielkopolski
 2001-2004  Amica Wronki
 2004-2005  Kujawiak Włocławek
 2005-2006  Zawisza Bydgoszcz
    2006    Kujawiak Włocławek
 2006-2007 Unia Janikowo
 2007-2008  GKP Gorzów Wielkopolski
 2009  Czarni Zagan
 2009–present  Polonia Słubice

External links
 

Polish footballers
Unia Janikowo players
1980 births
Living people
People from Skwierzyna
Sportspeople from Lubusz Voivodeship

Association football defenders